Polat Can (Ahmad Mohammad), born in 1980, in Kobane (Syria), is a Kurdish political activist from Syria. He is one of the founders and main commanders of the People's Defense Units (YPG), and serves as the organization's official spokesperson. He also serves as the coalition commander of the Syrian Democratic Forces.

He is also a journalist and writer, author of a literary production in Kurdish, Arabic and Turkish.

Biography 
Born on 20 March 1980 in Kobanê, Polat Can began early in the Kurdish national liberation movement. It first takes place in the ranks of the People's Defense Units (YPG).

He held many positions in the various press services linked to the movement. He was once editor-in-chief of Mesopotamia magazine, published in the Yerevan, and Democratic Middle East magazine, published in Baghdad.

He is one of the founders of the Confederation of Kurdish Patriotic Students(Xwendekar), of which he becomes the general coordinator. He is still responsible for university students at the Mazlum Dogan Academy.

People's Protection Units 

Polat Can is one of the founding members of the People's Protection Units (YPG) in Syria. He became the official spokesperson for this organization during the fight against Daesh, during the Syrian civil war (in particular the first and second battles of Kobane).
Polat Can, in addition to his functions within the YPG, also assumes a command post within the Syrian Democratic Forces, a coalition of which the YPG is a part but which includes other armed organizations.

Meeting with the representative of the United States 
In early 2016, Polat Can met with an official representative of the United States, Brett McGurk, then under President Obama. This meeting gave rise to a lively controversy in Turkey.

Work 

He writes in Kurdish, Arabic, Turkish and English. Several of his books have been published in five languages. He has written for many years in magazines, newspapers and on the internet.

English publications 
 The Practical projects for Building the Autonomous Administration- 2020
 Solution Prospects - 2021
 My Beating Heart (stories) 2019

Kurdish publications 
 NavName (Kurdish Names Dictionary) 2017–2019
 Berfa Germ (short Stories) 2009/2016/2017–2019
 Qulingên Rewanê (search in Kurdish Classical Music and songs) 2017/2019–2021
 Zimanê Firîşteyan (about Kurdish Language) 2005–2012
 Projeyên Pratîkî yên avakirina Xweseriyê (The Practical projects for Building the Autonomous Administration) 2011–2020
 Asoyên Çareseriyê (Solution Prospects) 2011–2021

Arabic publications 
 آه یا صغیرتی  - 2021
 في نقد العقل الشرقي  - 2021
 آفاق الحل -2021
 المشاريع العملية لبناء الإدارة الذاتية - 2020
 مدخل إلى الأعلام الكردية - 2012
 لغة الملائكة -  2012
 لمحات عن حزب العمال الكردستاني - 2009
 آفاق كونفدرالية- 2006
 نساء القرنفل
 من روجافا إلى شنكال

Turkish publications 
 Göçmen Yürekler (About Kurdish Women in the Caucasus) 2006

References 

https://polatcan.info/bio/
https://dckurd.org/2015/07/28/interview-with-polat-can-the-representative-of-the-peoples-protection-units-to-the-international-coalition/
https://thekurdishproject.org/interview-with-kurdish-ypg-leader-polat-can/
https://bellacaledonia.org.uk/2020/11/22/a-handbook-for-revolution/
https://polatcan.info/

Kurdish-American history
1980 births
Living people
Syrian Kurdish politicians
Kurdish activists
Kobanî
Rojava politicians
People's Protection Units
Syrian Democratic Forces
Kurdish-language magazines